Neil McComb is a former professional rugby union player for Ulster Rugby. His favoured position is lock. His last appearance for Ulster was in the 2014-15 season.

In 2002, he captained Campbell College to a 12–10 victory over Methodist College Belfast in the Ulster Schools' Cup final.

References

Ulster Rugby players
Living people
Year of birth missing (living people)